Grant Albrecht (born January 29, 1981) is a Canadian luger who has competed since 1998. Competing in two Winter Olympics, he earned his best finish of tenth in the men's doubles event at Turin in 2006.

Albrecht's best finish at the FIL World Luge Championships was ninth in the men's doubles event at Nagano in 2004.

After his competition career Albrecht has worked as a luge coach, coaching the Australian national team at the 2010 Winter Olympics in Vancouver and subsequently coaching the Norwegian national team before being appointed as Alberta Development Coach by the Canadian Luge Association in August 2011.

He resides in Red Deer, Alberta in the offseason.

References

 2002 luge men's doubles results (todor66.com)
 2006 luge men's doubles results (todor66.com)
 CBC.ca profile
 FIL-Luge profile

External links 
 
 
 
 

1981 births
Living people
Canadian male lugers
Canadian sports coaches
Olympic lugers of Canada
Lugers at the 2002 Winter Olympics
Lugers at the 2006 Winter Olympics
Sportspeople from Red Deer, Alberta
Canadian people of German descent